The 2011 European minifootball Championships was the second edition of the unofficial European minifootball championships, a forerunner of the EMF miniEURO, a competition for national Small-sided football teams. It was hosted in Tulcea, Romania, from 5 to 6 November 2011.

The defending champions, Romania, kept their title by overcoming Czech Republic 5–4 on penalties after 3–3 in the final.

Group stage

Group A

Group B

Knockout stage
The knockout stage matches were played on 6 November 2011. If a match is drawn after 40 minutes of regular play, a penalty shoot-out is used to determine the winner.

Bracket

References

External links
 Official EMF website

2011
International association football competitions hosted by Romania
2011 in European sport
2011 in Romanian sport
Tulcea County